Jordan Maksymic is a professional Canadian football coach who is currently the offensive coordinator for the BC Lions of the Canadian Football League (CFL).

Early life
Maksymic grew up in St. Albert, Alberta, where he played at quarterback for his high school team, the Bellerose Bulldogs. Upon graduation, he joined the team as an assistant coach for 2005 and 2006. His neighbour, Tom Higgins, had introduced him to football while he was he head coach and general manager of the Edmonton Eskimos and invited him to work as a water boy in 2006 for the Calgary Stampeders while Higgins was the head coach for the team. He then worked as a video coordinator for the Stampeders in 2007 and 2008.

Coaching career

Northern Arizona
Maksymic worked as a graduate assistant for the Northern Arizona Lumberjacks in 2009 and 2010 while he went to school at Northern Arizona University.

Edmonton Eskimos
Maksymic was hired as the video coordinator for the Edmonton Eskimos in 2011 and also served in that role in 2012. He was added to the coaching staff as an offensive assistant in 2013.

Ottawa Redblacks
Maksymic was hired by the expansion Ottawa Redblacks in 2014 to serve as an offensive assistant on the coaching staff. He was promoted to running backs coach for the 2015 season where the team made an appearance in the 103rd Grey Cup.

Edmonton Eskimos (II)
In 2016, it was announced that Maksymic had re-joined the Edmonton Eskimos to be part of Jason Maas' staff as the team's quarterbacks coach. In 2018, he added the title of pass game coordinator in addition to his quarterback coaching duties. He was further promoted to offensive coordinator and quarterbacks coach for the 2019 season, although Maas continued to call the plays.

BC Lions
Following a coaching change in Edmonton, Maksymic joined the BC Lions in January 2020 as the team's offensive coordinator, reuniting him with former Redblacks head coach, Rick Campbell. In his first season calling plays, quarterback Michael Reilly led the league in passing and the Lions had two receivers, Bryan Burnham and Lucky Whitehead, named as CFL All-Stars.

References

External links
 BC Lions profile

1987 births
Living people
Sportspeople from St. Albert, Alberta
BC Lions coaches
Edmonton Elks coaches
Ottawa Redblacks coaches